Gornaya Proleyka is a rural locality (a selo) and the administrative center of Gornoproleyskoye Rural Settlement, Dubovsky District, Volgograd Oblast, Russia. The population was 1,310 as of 2010. There are 33 streets.

Geography 
Gornaya Proleyka is located in steppe, on the west bank of the Volgograd Reservoir, 53 km north of Dubovka (the district's administrative centre) by road. Strelnoshirokoye is the nearest rural locality.

References 

Rural localities in Dubovsky District, Volgograd Oblast